James David McCawley (March 30, 1938 – April 10, 1999) was a Scottish-American linguist.

Biography
McCawley was born James Quillan McCawley, Jr. to Dr. Monica Bateman McCawley (b. 1901), a physician and surgeon, and James Quillan McCawley (b. 1899), a businessman. In 1939 his father and two brothers moved to Toronto and founded a roofing company, but his mother remained in Glasgow with the children until after World War II. James Sr. moved to New York City and finally Chicago, where the family joined him. It was on his arrival in America that young McCawley changed his name to James David McCawley, dropping the "Junior."

He skipped several grades in school, entered the University of Chicago in 1954 at the age of 16, and soon gained early admission to the graduate school, from which he received an M.S. in mathematics in 1958. He then received a Fulbright fellowship to study mathematics and logic in 1959–60 at Westfälische Wilhelms-Universität in Münster. During this time he became disillusioned with mathematics, and after sitting in on a linguistics course taught by Eric Hamp, he became more and more interested in the subject and began taking language courses; on his return to America, he applied to the new linguistics graduate program at MIT and was accepted, spending the next three years as a member of the first Ph.D. class there. He worked as a research assistant with the Mechanical Translation group in 1962 and 1963, and in 1965 he received his doctorate for a dissertation under Noam Chomsky on The accentual system of modern standard Japanese. By this time he had already returned to the University of Chicago as Assistant Professor of Linguistics.

McCawley worked at the Department of Linguistics at the University of Chicago from 1964 until his sudden and unexpected death. At the time of his passing, he was working on two books, a collection of his recent articles and a text on the relation of philosophy of science to linguistics. Advisees include Donka Farkas, William O'Grady, Georgia M. Green, and Salikoko Mufwene.

His interests encompassed syntax, semantics, pragmatics, and phonology. He is perhaps best known within linguistics for his work in generative semantics. Outside academia he is noted for The Eater's Guide to Chinese Characters, his guidebook to deciphering Chinese restaurant menus. He had an interest in libertarian politics and once ran (unsuccessfully) for election to state office on the Libertarian ticket.

Under the pseudonym "Quang Phúc Đông" (supposedly a linguist at the fictitious South Hanoi Institute of Technology), McCawley wrote a paper on "English sentences without overt grammatical subject."

References

Books
The Phonological Component of a Grammar of Japanese. The Hague: Mouton, 1968. (Revised version of PhD thesis, The accentual system of standard Japanese.)
Grammar and Meaning: Papers on Syntactic and Semantic Topics. Tokyo: Taishukan, 1973. Reprint. New York: Academic Press, 1976. 
Notes from the Linguistic Underground. (Syntax and Semantics, vol. 7.) New York: Academic Press, 1976. 
Adverbs, Vowels, and Other Objects of Wonder. University of Chicago Press, 1979. 
Everything that Linguists Have Always Wanted to Know About Logic (but were Ashamed to Ask). University of Chicago Press, 1981.  Blackwell, 1982.  (hardback),  (paperback) / 2nd ed. University of Chicago Press, 1993. 
Thirty Million Theories of Grammar. University of Chicago Press, 1982. 
The Eater's Guide to Chinese Characters. University of Chicago Press, 1984.  Reprint. University of Chicago Press, 2004. 
The Syntactic Phenomena of English. University of Chicago Press, 1988. 2 vols. Vol. 1 , Vol. 2 
A Linguistic Flea Circus. Bloomington: Indiana University Linguistics Club, 1991. / 2nd ed. University of Chicago Press, 1998.  (hardback)  (paperback)

Further reading
Brentari, Diane, Gary N. Larson, and Lynn A. McCleod, eds. The Joy of Grammar: A Festschrift in Honor of James D. McCawley. Amsterdam: Benjamins, 1992.
 
  
 
 
 
 Mufwene, Salikoko S., Elaine J. Francis, and Rebecca S. Wheeler, eds. Polymorphous Linguistics: Jim McCawley's Legacy. Cambridge: MIT Press, 2005.  (alk. paper);  (pbk.). ["Publications by Jim McCawley," xvii-xxx.]
 
Trillin, Calvin, "Divining the Mysteries of the East," in Third Helpings, 1983; New Haven and New York: Ticknor & Fields . Reprinted in The Tummy Trilogy, 1994; New York: Farrar Straus and Giroux, .
Zwicky, Arnold M., Peter Salus, Robert I. Binnick, and Anthony Vanek (eds.) Studies out in Left Field: Defamatory essays presented to James D. McCawley on his 33rd or 34th birthday. Edmonton, Alb.: Linguistic Research. 1971. Reprint.

External links
  at the University of Chicago (last revised in 2006 and as stored at archive.org)
 Memorial page at the University of Chicago
 "English sentences without overt grammatical subject" (PDF)

Satirical linguistics 
Papers by and about McCawley, which originally appeared in Lingua Pranca in 1978:
 Dates in the Month of May that Are of Interest to Linguists, James D. McCawley
 Linguistic Influences In Recent Research On Music, James D. McCawley
 Current Issues in Gastronomy, Elan Dresher and Norbert Hornstein

1938 births
1999 deaths
Scottish emigrants to the United States
Linguists from the United States
Syntacticians
University of Chicago faculty
Linguistic Society of America presidents
20th-century linguists
Linguists of Japanese